Edward S. Boyden is an American neuroscientist at MIT. He is the Y. Eva Tan Professor in Neurotechnology, a faculty member in the MIT Media Lab and an associate member of the McGovern Institute for Brain Research. In 2018 he was named a Howard Hughes Medical Institute Investigator. He is recognized for his work on optogenetics. In this technology, a light-sensitive ion channel such as channelrhodopsin-2 is genetically expressed in neurons, allowing neuronal activity to be controlled by light. There were early efforts to achieve targeted optical control dating back to 2002 that did not involve a directly light-activated ion channel, but it was the method based on directly light-activated channels from microbes, such as channelrhodopsin, emerging in 2005 that turned out to be broadly useful. Optogenetics in this way has been widely adopted by neuroscientists as a research tool, and it is also thought to have potential therapeutic applications. Boyden joined the MIT faculty in 2007, and continues to develop new optogenetic tools as well as other technologies for the manipulation of brain activity. Previously, Boyden received degrees in electrical engineering, computer science, and physics from MIT. During high school, Boyden attended the Texas Academy of Mathematics and Science.

Awards 

In 2008 Boyden was named by Discover Magazine as one of the top 20 scientists under 40. In 2006, he was named to the MIT Technology Review TR35 as one of the top 35 innovators in the world under the age of 35. In 2013 he shared the Jacob Heskel Gabbay Award for Biotechnology and Medicine with Karl Deisseroth and Gero Miesenböck.

On November 29, 2015, Edward Boyden was one of five scientists honored with the Breakthrough Prize in Life Sciences, awarded for “transformative advances toward understanding living systems and extending human life.”

He has received the 2015 BBVA Foundation Frontiers of Knowledge Award in Biomedicine, jointly with Karl Deisseroth and Gero Miesenböck, for the development of optogenetics, the most unique technique for studying the brain today. In 2018, Boyden won the Canada Gairdner Foundation International Award, jointly with Karl Deisseroth and Peter Hegemann. In 2019, he was awarded the Rumford Prize for "extraordinary contributions related to the invention and refinement of optogenetics," with Ernst Bamberg, Karl Deisseroth, Peter Hegemann, Gero Miesenböck, and Georg Nagel. In the same year, he, Deisseroth, Hegemann, and Miesenböck won the Warren Alpert Foundation Prize.

He was elected to the National Academy of Sciences in 2019. In 2020, Boyden was awarded with the Wilhelm Exner Medal.

References

External links

Ed Boyden's personal home page
Boyden lab page at MIT Media Lab
McGovern Institute for Brain Research
Ed Boyden: A light switch for neurons at TED
SPIE TV: Ed Boyden: Expansion microscopy -- A new tool in brain research

1979 births
Living people
American neuroscientists
MIT School of Architecture and Planning faculty
MIT Media Lab people
Members of the United States National Academy of Sciences
MIT Department of Physics alumni